HTC Evo is a line of mobile telephones developed by HTC Corporation. Individual models include:

 HTC Evo 3D a.k.a. HTC Evo V
 HTC Evo 4G a.k.a. HTC Evo WiMAX ISW11HT/HTC Supersonic
 HTC Evo 4G LTE
 HTC Evo 4G+
 HTC Evo Design 4G a.k.a. HTC Hero S
 HTC Evo Shift 4G
 HTC Evo View 4G a.k.a. HTC Flyer

Evo